The Twitya Formation is a geologic formation in Canada’s Northwest Territories. It preserves fossils dating back to the Ediacaran period.

See also

 List of fossiliferous stratigraphic units in Northwest Territories

References
 

Ediacaran Northwest Territories